Sifre Zutta was a midrash on the Book of Numbers. Medieval authors mention it under the titles "Sifre shel Panim Acherim" and "Vi-Yeshallehu Zutta"; and to distinguish from it the Sifre, Or Zarua calls the latter "Sifre Rabbati."

The Sifre Zutta has not been preserved; and apparently was no longer extant by the time of Abraham Bakrat (around 1500). However, fragments of Sifre Zutta have been discovered in the Cairo Geniza, and excerpts from it are quoted in the Midrash HaGadol and in Yalkut Shimoni. Compilations have been published.

Quotations in other early works 
Earlier authors knew of it and occasionally quoted it,  e.g., R. Samson of Sens in his commentary on the mishnaic orders Zera'im and Ṭohorot. Numerous fragments are found in Yalkut Shimoni to Book of Numbers. Quotations are found also in Numbers Rabbah to Naso. The "Mekhilta to Numbers" frequently quoted by Maimonides in his Sefer ha-Mitzvot is identical to the Sifre Zutta; for all his quotations may be identified among the fragments of the Sifre contained in the Yalḳuṭ Shimoni, except a single passage in Shoresh 11 referring to a Biblical section, on which Yalkut Shimoni has not quoted the Sifre. Maimonides frequently drew upon the Sifre Zutta in his Yad ha-Hazakah also. Other medieval authors who occasionally quoted it are mentioned by Brüll.

The Midrash HaGadol to Numbers quotes the majority of the Sifre Zutta, and has recently become a source of information concerning the latter. Around 1900, Königsberger began to edit the Sifre Zutta on the basis of the extracts in the Midrash ha-Gadol and Yalkut Shimoni. A small fragment of the Sifre has been published by Solomon Schechter.

From the School of R. Akiva 

Furthermore, some of the views expressed in the Sifre Zutta correspond with views known to be R. Akiva's, as in 5:14, and 5:15. The midrash may be assigned to Simeon bar Yochai rather than to Judah bar Ilai (as is done in the case of the Sifra), although perhaps some of the anonymous halakhot, such as 5:15 and 15:4 express Judah's views. R. Simeon's authorship is indicated by the fact that he is mentioned least often in the midrash, and that of the later tanna R. Eleazar b. Simeon is mentioned a few times.

There are additional indications pointing to Simeon's authorship, as, for example, the enumeration of the positive and negative commandments, which is said to be a characteristic of the Sifre to Deuteronomy, this midrash also being ascribed to Simeon. Further evidence is presented by the correspondence of various halakot with R. Simeon's views. Aside from the passages quoted by D. Hoffmann, some of which represent Simeon's views more exactly than others—the parallel between 5:7 and Mekhilta Mishpatim 15 is doubtful, on account of the different readings in the Mekilta—still others must be taken into account; e.g., Sifre Zutta 5:21 compared with Tosefta, Shevuot 3:7; 6:20, with Nazir 46a; and, what is especially characteristic, the reason for the law under consideration is inquired into, as in 5:15 and 19:16.

The well-known reference of the Talmud, may therefore apply to Sifre Zutta, in which, furthermore, there are several exegetical notes on passages of Book of Numbers mentioned in the Talmud, but which are not found in the larger Sifre. The fact that the Sifre Zutta to 5:27 contradicts R. Simeon's view shows merely that the editor drew also upon other midrashim, including, perhaps, that of R. Eliezer ben Jacob and that of R. Ishmael. The fact that R. Judah haNasi is not mentioned leads Hoffmann to the conclusion that the Sifre Zutta was not edited by a student of Judah. Some tannaim are mentioned therein whose names are not found elsewhere; e.g., Simeon ben Nehunyon and Papyas of Ono.

By 1900, the Sifre Zutta had not yet been thoroughly studied.

References

Jewish Encyclopedia bibliography 
Besides the authorities quoted in the text:
W. Bacher, in J. Q. R. 1896, viii. 329–333;
A. Epstein, in R. E. J. xxix. 316 et seq.: idem, in Allg. Zeit. des Jud. 1894, No. 34;
Zunz, G. V. p. 51.

Halakhic Midrashim
Book of Numbers